Ardagh (older version ) is a village in County Longford, Ireland. Originally a site of pre-Christian worship, Ardagh became a site of Christian settlement with the arrival of Saint Patrick sometime between 434 and 435. The bulk of the village was laid-out in the mid-19th century.

History

Early and pre-history
Ardagh village is located beside Ardagh Mountain, a hill which reaches a height . This hill, formerly known as Brí Leith, was believed to be home of Midir, a pre-Christian god. Brí Leith is associated with several folkloric stories and is mentioned in the Book of Tara. The Book of Rights notes that the high king was entitled to have bilberries from Brí Leith as part of his harvest meal.

There are several important Early Christian sites in and near Ardagh, including the Church of St. Mel. St. Mel is the patron of Ardagh and was the first bishop, he was part of St. Patrick's entourage and some say he was his nephew. This means the history of Ardagh dates back to the dawn of Christianity in Ireland, and it's episcopal succession can be tracked back to one of the primitive fathers of the Irish church.

During the medieval period, Ardagh experienced some "religious turmoil", and in 1167 the settlement, including the church and houses, was burned down. Then, in 1230, Ardagh was the scene of contest for the role of bishop, resulting it the destruction of the episcopal house and cathedral tower. William O'Ferrall, who was Bishop of Ardagh in 1496 (and had been since 1479), tried to take over as the chieftain of Longford (known as the lordship of Annaly at the time). His aim was to take over as chieftain from the other branch of the O'Ferrall family, resulting in an attack on Ardagh. After the attack, the cathedral was left without a roof, sacristy, campanile, and bell, leaving only a single altar standing. The church is still in ruins today and the village saw limited development until the Featherston family arrived in the 1700s.

Featherston family 
The first Featherston recorded in Ardagh was Thomas Featherston, who acquired 235 acres of land in the area in 1703. He died in 1749. While no exact date is known for the construction of Ardagh House, it is believed to have been visited by Oliver Goldsmith in 1745. According to local legend, Goldsmith's visit to Ardagh House inspired his comedy She Stoops to Conquer or Mistakes of a Night. Reputedly, while looking for an inn, some locals directed Goldsmith to the Featherston mansion "in jest". According to this story, the Featherstons realised the joke and played along. The following morning, Goldsmith was made aware of his mistake and, years after the experience, he used the events to influence the plot of his comedy.

Sir Ralph Fetherston, 1st Baronet, was given the rank of baronet in 1776, and this descended to later heads of the family. Among the contributions of the Fetherston baronets to Ardagh were significant developments carried out within the village in the 1860s. Much of the village layout was designed and built by the architect J. Rawson Carroll, reputedly based on Lady Fetherston's idea of a Swiss village. A clock tower, village green, and arts-and-crafts style houses were designed with the view from the house in mind. The view from the front door of Ardagh House encompasses much of the village, from the Church of Ireland church on the left, to the old rectory on the right.

Later development
Ardagh's Heritage Centre tracks the history of the village, including its literary associations, which include featuring pseudonymously in Oliver Goldsmith's She Stoops to Conquer, and in a poem by Eavan Boland.

The village was awarded the Prix d'Honneur of the Entente Florale and won the Irish Tidy Towns Competition on three occasions in 1989, 1996 and 1998.

Development and architecture 
In recent years Ardagh has been "rejuvenated" with some young families building new houses beside the village. The centre of Ardagh village is still the village green, with four roads stemming from the centre; towards Longford (north), Mullingar (west), east in the direction of Edgeworthstrown and the south road is a cul de sac. There are many different styles of houses in Ardagh dating back to the 1860s. However, the building materials have stayed relatively the same throughout the years, with one modern difference being the black cast iron gutters in some cases being replaced with more modern equivalents such as aluminium or uPVC. The fasciae are one of the most distinctive features of 1860 houses in Ardagh. The original fasciae are ornately carved timber however, this is another category of features that have been replaced with modern equivalents. The 1860s' houses were built from ashlar limestone or sandstone, with limestone corner stones and details around the windows, while the more modern houses are a combination of stone or brick covered in plaster. Some houses also have a shamrock fanlight above the door. While no original doors remain from 1860, the unusual shape of the doorway suggests they could have been wooden double doors. Every house designed by Rawson Carroll also has a shed which (together with the boundary walls) is part of the "character of the village".

Public transport
Edgeworthstown railway station is around 9 kilometres from the village. Until August 2013, Bus Éireann route 118 (Dublin-Mullingar-Longford) served Ardagh on Saturdays.

See also

 List of towns and villages in Ireland

References

Towns and villages in County Longford
Planned communities in the Republic of Ireland